Men & Mascara is the second album from American country music artist Julie Roberts. It was released in 2006 on Mercury Nashville Records and it produced two singles: the title track and a cover of Saving Jane's "Girl Next Door". Neither of these singles charted for Roberts. The song "Too Damn Young" was later recorded by Luke Bryan on his 2011 album Tailgates & Tanlines.

Byron Gallimore produced the album except for "Girl Next Door", which was produced by James Stroud.

Track listing

Personnel
Tom Bukovac - electric guitar
Mark Casstevens - banjo, acoustic guitar
Lisa Cochran - background vocals
Chip Davis - background vocals
Paul Franklin - dobro, steel guitar, slide guitar
Lisa Gregg - background vocals
Aubrey Haynie - fiddle, mandolin
David Hungate - bass guitar
Jeff King - electric guitar
Paul Leim - drums
Hillary Lindsey - background vocals
B. James Lowry - acoustic guitar, resonator guitar
Steve Nathan - keyboards, organ, piano, synthesizer, Wurlitzer
Julie Roberts - lead vocals
Marty Slayton - background vocals
Russell Terrell - background vocals
Lonnie Wilson - drums, drum loops, percussion
Glenn Worf - bass guitar

Chart performance

References

2006 albums
Albums produced by Byron Gallimore
Mercury Nashville albums
Julie Roberts albums